Sutton railway station is a railway station in Fingal, Ireland that serves the village and district of Sutton, and is also accessible from Baldoyle.

History
The station opened on 30 July 1846. The Howth tram ran between here and Howth railway station until 1959.

The station is on the coastal road from Sutton to Baldoyle, near Sutton Golf Club. The ticket office is open from 05:45 to 20:00, Monday to Sunday.

See also
 List of railway stations in Ireland

References

External links

 Irish Rail Sutton Station Website
 Eiretrains - Sutton & Baldoyle Station

Sutton, Dublin
Baldoyle
Iarnród Éireann stations in Fingal
Railway stations opened in 1846
Railway stations in Fingal
1846 establishments in Ireland
Buildings listed on the Fingal Record of Protected Structures
Railway stations in the Republic of Ireland opened in 1846